Bats are mammals of the order Chiroptera. With their forelimbs adapted as wings, they are the only mammals capable of true and sustained flight. Bats are more agile in flight than most birds, flying with their very long spread-out digits covered with a thin membrane or patagium.

The second largest order of mammals after rodents, bats comprise about 20% of all classified mammal species worldwide, with over 1,400 species. These were traditionally divided into two suborders: the largely fruit-eating megabats, and the echolocating microbats. But more recent evidence has supported dividing the order into Yinpterochiroptera and Yangochiroptera, with megabats as members of the former along with several species of microbats. Many bats are insectivores, and most of the rest are frugivores (fruit-eaters) or nectarivores (nectar-eaters). A few species feed on animals other than insects; for example, the vampire bats feed on blood. Most bats are nocturnal, and many roost in caves or other refuges; it is uncertain whether bats have these behaviours to escape predators. Bats are present throughout the world, with the exception of extremely cold regions. They are important in their ecosystems for pollinating flowers and dispersing seeds; many tropical plants depend entirely on bats for these services.

Bats provide humans with some direct benefits, at the cost of some disadvantages. Bat dung has been mined as guano from caves and used as fertiliser. Bats consume insect pests, reducing the need for pesticides and other insect management measures. They are sometimes numerous enough and close enough to human settlements to serve as tourist attractions, and they are used as food across Asia and the Pacific Rim. However, fruit bats are frequently considered pests by fruit growers. Due to their physiology, bats are one type of animal that acts as a natural reservoir of many pathogens, such as rabies; and since they are highly mobile, social, and long-lived, they can readily spread disease among themselves. If humans interact with bats, these traits become potentially dangerous to humans. Some bats are also predators of mosquitoes, suppressing the transmission of mosquito-borne diseases.

Depending on the culture, bats may be symbolically associated with positive traits, such as protection from certain diseases or risks, rebirth, or long life, but in the West, bats are popularly associated with darkness, malevolence, witchcraft, vampires, and death.

Etymology 

An older English name for bats is flittermouse, which matches their name in other Germanic languages (for example German Fledermaus and Swedish fladdermus), related to the fluttering of wings. Middle English had bakke, most likely cognate with Old Swedish natbakka ("night-bat"), which may have undergone a shift from -k- to -t- (to Modern English bat) influenced by Latin blatta, "moth, nocturnal insect". The word "bat" was probably first used in the early 1570s. The name "Chiroptera" derives from cheir, "hand" and πτερόνpteron, "wing".

Phylogeny and taxonomy

Evolution 

The delicate skeletons of bats do not fossilise well; it is estimated that only 12% of bat genera that lived have been found in the fossil record. Most of the oldest known bat fossils were already very similar to modern microbats, such as Archaeopteropus (32 million years ago). The extinct bats Palaeochiropteryx tupaiodon (48 million years ago) and Hassianycteris kumari (48 million years ago) are the first fossil mammals whose colouration has been discovered: both were reddish-brown.

Bats were formerly grouped in the superorder Archonta, along with the treeshrews (Scandentia), colugos (Dermoptera), and primates. Modern genetic evidence now places bats in the superorder Laurasiatheria, with its sister taxon as Fereuungulata, which includes carnivorans, pangolins, odd-toed ungulates, even-toed ungulates, and cetaceans. One study places Chiroptera as a sister taxon to odd-toed ungulates (Perissodactyla).

The flying primate hypothesis proposed that when adaptations to flight are removed, megabats are allied to primates by anatomical features not shared with microbats and thus flight evolved twice in mammals. Genetic studies have strongly supported the monophyly of bats and the single origin of mammal flight.

Inner systematic

Genetic evidence indicates that megabats originated during the early Eocene, and belong within the four major lines of microbats. Two new suborders have been proposed; Yinpterochiroptera includes the Pteropodidae, or megabat family, as well as the families Rhinolophidae, Hipposideridae, Craseonycteridae, Megadermatidae, and Rhinopomatidae. Yangochiroptera includes the other families of bats (all of which use laryngeal echolocation), a conclusion supported by a 2005 DNA study. A 2013 phylogenomic study supported the two new proposed suborders.

The 2003 discovery of an early fossil bat from the 52-million-year-old Green River Formation, Onychonycteris finneyi, indicates that flight evolved before echolocative abilities. Onychonycteris had claws on all five of its fingers, whereas modern bats have at most two claws on two digits of each hand. It also had longer hind legs and shorter forearms, similar to climbing mammals that hang under branches, such as sloths and gibbons. This palm-sized bat had short, broad wings, suggesting that it could not fly as fast or as far as later bat species. Instead of flapping its wings continuously while flying, Onychonycteris probably alternated between flaps and glides in the air. This suggests that this bat did not fly as much as modern bats, but flew from tree to tree and spent most of its time climbing or hanging on branches. The distinctive features of the Onychonycteris fossil also support the hypothesis that mammalian flight most likely evolved in arboreal locomotors, rather than terrestrial runners. This model of flight development, commonly known as the "trees-down" theory, holds that bats first flew by taking advantage of height and gravity to drop down on to prey, rather than running fast enough for a ground-level take off.

The molecular phylogeny was controversial, as it pointed to microbats not having a unique common ancestry, which implied that some seemingly unlikely transformations occurred. The first is that laryngeal echolocation evolved twice in bats, once in Yangochiroptera and once in the rhinolophoids. The second is that laryngeal echolocation had a single origin in Chiroptera, was subsequently lost in the family Pteropodidae (all megabats), and later evolved as a system of tongue-clicking in the genus Rousettus. Analyses of the sequence of the vocalization gene FoxP2 were inconclusive on whether laryngeal echolocation was lost in the pteropodids or gained in the echolocating lineages. Echolocation probably first derived in bats from communicative calls. The Eocene bats Icaronycteris (52 million years ago) and Palaeochiropteryx had cranial adaptations suggesting an ability to detect ultrasound. This may have been used at first mainly to forage on the ground for insects and map out their surroundings in their gliding phase, or for communicative purposes. After the adaptation of flight was established, it may have been refined to target flying prey by echolocation. Analyses of the hearing gene Prestin seem to favour the idea that echolocation developed independently at least twice, rather than being lost secondarily in the pteropodids, but ontogenic analysis of the cochlea supports that laryngeal echolocation evolved only once.

Classification

Bats are placental mammals. After rodents, they are the largest order, making up about 20% of mammal species. In 1758, Carl Linnaeus classified the seven bat species he knew of in the genus Vespertilio in the order Primates. Around twenty years later, the German naturalist Johann Friedrich Blumenbach gave them their own order, Chiroptera. Since then, the number of described species has risen to over 1,400, traditionally classified as two suborders: Megachiroptera (megabats), and Microchiroptera (microbats/echolocating bats). Not all megabats are larger than microbats. Several characteristics distinguish the two groups. Microbats use echolocation for navigation and finding prey, but megabats apart from those in the genus Rousettus do not. Accordingly, megabats have a well-developed eyesight. Megabats have a claw on the second finger of the forelimb. The external ears of microbats do not close to form a ring; the edges are separated from each other at the base of the ear. Megabats eat fruit, nectar, or pollen, while most microbats eat insects; others feed on fruit, nectar, pollen, fish, frogs, small mammals, or blood.

Below is a table chart following the bat classification of families recognized by various authors of the ninth volume of Handbook of the Mammals of the World published in 2019:

Anatomy and physiology

Skull and dentition

The head and teeth shape of bats can vary by species. In general, megabats have longer snouts, larger eye sockets and smaller ears, giving them a more dog-like appearance, which is the source of their nickname of "flying foxes". Among microbats, longer snouts are associated with nectar-feeding. while vampire bats have reduced snouts to accommodate large incisors and canines.

Small insect-eating bats can have as many as 38 teeth, while vampire bats have only 20. Bats that feed on hard-shelled insects have fewer but larger teeth with longer canines and more robust lower jaws than species that prey on softer bodied insects. In nectar-feeding bats, the canines are long while the cheek-teeth are reduced. In fruit-eating bats, the cusps of the cheek teeth are adapted for crushing. The upper incisors of vampire bats lack enamel, which keeps them razor-sharp. The bite force of small bats is generated through mechanical advantage, allowing them to bite through the hardened armour of insects or the skin of fruit.

Wings and flight

Bats are the only mammals capable of sustained flight, as opposed to gliding, as in the flying squirrel.

The finger bones of bats are much more flexible than those of other mammals, owing to their flattened cross-section and to low levels of calcium near their tips. The elongation of bat digits, a key feature required for wing development, is due to the upregulation of bone morphogenetic proteins (Bmps). During embryonic development, the gene controlling Bmp signalling, Bmp2, is subjected to increased expression in bat forelimbsresulting in the extension of the manual digits. This crucial genetic alteration helps create the specialized limbs required for powered flight. The relative proportion of extant bat forelimb digits compared with those of Eocene fossil bats have no significant differences, suggesting that bat wing morphology has been conserved for over fifty million years. During flight, the bones undergo bending and shearing stress; the bending stresses felt are smaller than in terrestrial mammals, but the shearing stress is larger. The wing bones of bats have a slightly lower breaking stress point than those of birds.

As in other mammals, and unlike in birds, the radius is the main component of the forearm. Bats have five elongated digits, which all radiate around the wrist. The thumb points forward and supports the leading edge of the wing, and the other digits support the tension held in the wing membrane. The second and third digits go along the wing tip, allowing the wing to be pulled forward against aerodynamic drag, without having to be thick as in pterosaur wings. The fourth and fifth digits go from the wrist to the trailing edge, and repel the bending force caused by air pushing up against the stiff membrane. Due to their flexible joints, bats are more maneuverable and more dexterous than gliding mammals.

The wings of bats are much thinner and consist of more bones than the wings of birds, allowing bats to maneuver more accurately than the latter, and fly with more lift and less drag. By folding the wings in toward their bodies on the upstroke, they save 35 percent energy during flight. The membranes are delicate, tearing easily, but can regrow, and small tears heal quickly. The surface of the wings is equipped with touch-sensitive receptors on small bumps called Merkel cells, also found on human fingertips. These sensitive areas are different in bats, as each bump has a tiny hair in the center, making it even more sensitive and allowing the bat to detect and adapt to changing airflow; the primary use is to judge the most efficient speed at which to fly, and possibly also to avoid stalls. Insectivorous bats may also use tactile hairs to help perform complex maneuvers to capture prey in flight.

The patagium is the wing membrane; it is stretched between the arm and finger bones, and down the side of the body to the hind limbs and tail. This skin membrane consists of connective tissue, elastic fibres, nerves, muscles, and blood vessels. The muscles keep the membrane taut during flight. The extent to which the tail of a bat is attached to a patagium can vary by species, with some having completely free tails or even no tails. The skin on the body of the bat, which has one layer of epidermis and dermis, as well as hair follicles, sweat glands and a fatty subcutaneous layer, is very different from the skin of the wing membrane. Depending on the bat species the presence of hair follicles and sweat glands will vary in the patagium. This patagium is an extremely thin double layer of epidermis; these layers are separated by a connective tissue center, rich with collagen and elastic fibers. In some bat species sweats glands will be present in between this connective tissue. Furthermore, if hair follicles are present this supports the bat in order to adjust sudden flight maneuvers. For bat embryos, apoptosis (cell death) affects only the hindlimbs, while the forelimbs retain webbing between the digits that forms into the wing membranes. Unlike birds, whose stiff wings deliver bending and torsional stress to the shoulders, bats have a flexible wing membrane that can resist only tension. To achieve flight, a bat exerts force inwards at the points where the membrane meets the skeleton, so that an opposing force balances it on the wing edges perpendicular to the wing surface. This adaptation does not permit bats to reduce their wingspans, unlike birds, which can partly fold their wings in flight, radically reducing the wing span and area for the upstroke and for gliding. Hence bats cannot travel over long distances as birds can.

Nectar- and pollen-eating bats can hover, in a similar way to hummingbirds. The sharp leading edges of the wings can create vortices, which provide lift. The vortex may be stabilized by the animal changing its wing curvatures.

Roosting and gaits

When not flying, bats hang upside down from their feet, a posture known as roosting. The femurs are attached at the hips in a way that allows them to bend outward and upward in flight. The ankle joint can flex to allow the trailing edge of the wings to bend downwards. This does not permit many movements other than hanging or clambering up trees. Most megabats roost with the head tucked towards the belly, whereas most microbats roost with the neck curled towards the back. This difference is reflected in the structure of the cervical or neck vertebrae in the two groups, which are clearly distinct. Tendons allow bats to lock their feet closed when hanging from a roost. Muscular power is needed to let go, but not to grasp a perch or when holding on.

When on the ground, most bats can only crawl awkwardly. A few species such as the New Zealand lesser short-tailed bat and the common vampire bat are agile on the ground. Both species make lateral gaits (the limbs move one after the other) when moving slowly but vampire bats move with a bounding gait (all limbs move in unison) at greater speeds, the folded up wings being used to propel them forward. Vampire bat likely evolved these gaits to follow their hosts while short-tailed bats developed in the absence of terrestrial mammal competitors. Enhanced terrestrial locomotion does not appear to have reduced their ability to fly.

Internal systems

Bats have an efficient circulatory system. They seem to make use of particularly strong venomotion, a rhythmic contraction of venous wall muscles. In most mammals, the walls of the veins provide mainly passive resistance, maintaining their shape as deoxygenated blood flows through them, but in bats they appear to actively support blood flow back to the heart with this pumping action. Since their bodies are relatively small and lightweight, bats are not at risk of blood flow rushing to their heads when roosting.

Bats possess a highly adapted respiratory system to cope with the demands of powered flight, an energetically taxing activity that requires a large continuous throughput of oxygen. In bats, the relative alveolar surface area and pulmonary capillary blood volume are larger than in most other small quadrupedal mammals. During flight the respiratory cycle has a one-to-one relationship with the wing-beat cycle. Because of the restraints of the mammalian lungs, bats cannot maintain high-altitude flight.

It takes a lot of energy and an efficient circulatory system to work the flight muscles of bats. Energy supply to the muscles engaged in flight requires about double the amount compared to the muscles that do not use flight as a means of mammalian locomotion. In parallel to energy consumption, blood oxygen levels of flying animals are twice as much as those of their terrestrially locomoting mammals. As the blood supply controls the amount of oxygen supplied throughout the body, the circulatory system must respond accordingly. Therefore, compared to a terrestrial mammal of the same relative size, the bat's heart can be up to three times larger, and pump more blood. Cardiac output is directly derived from heart rate and stroke volume of the blood; an active microbat can reach a heart rate of 1000 beats per minute.

With its extremely thin membranous tissue, a bat's wing can significantly contribute to the organism's total gas exchange efficiency. Because of the high energy demand of flight, the bat's body meets those demands by exchanging gas through the patagium of the wing. When the bat has its wings spread it allows for an increase in surface area to volume ratio. The surface area of the wings is about 85% of the total body surface area, suggesting the possibility of a useful degree of gas exchange. The subcutaneous vessels in the membrane lie very close to the surface and allow for the diffusion of oxygen and carbon dioxide.

The digestive system of bats has varying adaptations depending on the species of bat and its diet. As in other flying animals, food is processed quickly and effectively to keep up with the energy demand. Insectivorous bats may have certain digestive enzymes to better process insects, such as chitinase to break down chitin, which is a large component of insects. Vampire bats, probably due to their diet of blood, are the only vertebrates that do not have the enzyme maltase, which breaks down malt sugar, in their intestinal tract. Nectivorous and frugivorous bats have more maltase and sucrase enzymes than insectivorous, to cope with the higher sugar contents of their diet.

The adaptations of the kidneys of bats vary with their diets. Carnivorous and vampire bats consume large amounts of protein and can output concentrated urine; their kidneys have a thin cortex and long renal papillae. Frugivorous bats lack that ability and have kidneys adapted for electrolyte-retention due to their low-electrolyte diet; their kidneys accordingly have a thick cortex and very short conical papillae. Bats have higher metabolic rates associated with flying, which lead to an increased respiratory water loss. Their large wings are composed of the highly vascularized membranes, increasing the surface area, and leading to cutaneous evaporative water loss. Water helps maintain their ionic balance in their blood, thermoregulation system, and removal of wastes and toxins from the body via urine. They are also susceptible to blood urea poisoning if they do not receive enough fluid.

The structure of the uterine system in female bats can vary by species, with some having two uterine horns while others have a single mainline chamber.

Senses

Echolocation

Microbats and a few megabats emit ultrasonic sounds to produce echoes. Sound intensity of these echos are dependent on subglottic pressure. The bats' cricothyroid muscle controls the orientation pulse frequency, which is an important function. This muscle is located inside the larynx and it is the only tensor muscle capable of aiding phonation. By comparing the outgoing pulse with the returning echoes, bats can gather information on their surroundings. This allows them to detect prey in darkness. Some bat calls can reach 140 decibels. Microbats use their larynx to emit echolocation signals through the mouth or the nose. Microbat calls range in frequency from 14,000 to well over 100,000 Hz, extending well beyond the range of human hearing (between 20 and 20,000 Hz). Various groups of bats have evolved fleshy extensions around and above the nostrils, known as nose-leaves, which play a role in sound transmission.

In low-duty cycle echolocation, bats can separate their calls and returning echoes by time. They have to time their short calls to finish before echoes return. The delay of the returning echoes allows the bat to estimate the range to their prey. In high-duty cycle echolocation, bats emit a continuous call and separate pulse and echo in frequency using the Doppler effect of their motion in flight. The shift of the returning echoes yields information relating to the motion and location of the bat's prey. These bats must deal with changes in the Doppler shift due to changes in their flight speed. They have adapted to change their pulse emission frequency in relation to their flight speed so echoes still return in the optimal hearing range.

In addition to echolocating prey, bat ears are sensitive to sounds made by their prey, such as the fluttering of moth wings. The complex geometry of ridges on the inner surface of bat ears helps to sharply focus echolocation signals, and to passively listen for any other sound produced by the prey. These ridges can be regarded as the acoustic equivalent of a Fresnel lens, and exist in a large variety of unrelated animals, such as the aye-aye, lesser galago, bat-eared fox, mouse lemur, and others. Bats can estimate the elevation of their target using the interference patterns from the echoes reflecting from the tragus, a flap of skin in the external ear.

By repeated scanning, bats can mentally construct an accurate image of the environment in which they are moving and of their prey. Some species of moth have exploited this, such as the tiger moths, which produces aposematic ultrasound signals to warn bats that they are chemically protected and therefore distasteful. Moth species including the tiger moth can produce signals to jam bat echolocation. Many moth species have a hearing organ called a tympanum, which responds to an incoming bat signal by causing the moth's flight muscles to twitch erratically, sending the moth into random evasive manoeuvres.

Vision

The eyes of most microbat species are small and poorly developed, leading to poor visual acuity, but no species is blind. Most microbats have mesopic vision, meaning that they can detect light only in low levels, whereas other mammals have photopic vision, which allows colour vision. Microbats may use their vision for orientation and while travelling between their roosting grounds and feeding grounds, as echolocation is effective only over short distances. Some species can detect ultraviolet (UV). As the bodies of some microbats have distinct coloration, they may be able to discriminate colours.

Megabat species often have eyesight as good as, if not better than, human vision. Their eyesight is adapted to both night and daylight vision, including some colour vision.

Magnetoreception

Microbats make use of magnetoreception, in that they have a high sensitivity to the Earth's magnetic field, as birds do. Microbats use a polarity-based compass, meaning that they differentiate north from south, unlike birds, which use the strength of the magnetic field to differentiate latitudes, which may be used in long-distance travel. The mechanism is unknown but may involve magnetite particles.

Thermoregulation

Most bats are homeothermic (having a stable body temperature), the exception being the vesper bats (Vespertilionidae), the horseshoe bats (Rhinolophidae), the free-tailed bats (Molossidae), and the bent-winged bats (Miniopteridae), which extensively use heterothermy (where body temperature can vary). Compared to other mammals, bats have a high thermal conductivity. The wings are filled with blood vessels, and lose body heat when extended. At rest, they may wrap their wings around themselves to trap a layer of warm air. Smaller bats generally have a higher metabolic rate than larger bats, and so need to consume more food in order to maintain homeothermy.

Bats may avoid flying during the day to prevent overheating in the sun, since their dark wing-membranes absorb solar radiation. Bats may not be able to dissipate heat if the ambient temperature is too high; they use saliva to cool themselves in extreme conditions. Among megabats, the flying fox Pteropus hypomelanus uses saliva and wing-fanning to cool itself while roosting during the hottest part of the day.

Bats also possess a system of sphincter valves on the arterial side of the vascular network that runs along the edge of their wings. When fully open, these allow oxygenated blood to flow through the capillary network across the wing membrane; when contracted, they shunt flow directly to the veins, bypassing the wing capillaries. This allows bats to control how much heat is exchanged through the flight membrane, allowing them to release heat during flight. Many other mammals use the capillary network in oversized ears for the same purpose.

Torpor

Torpor, a state of decreased activity where the body temperature and metabolism decreases, is especially useful for bats, as they use a large amount of energy while active, depend upon an unreliable food source, and have a limited ability to store fat. Tropical bats may use it to avoid predation, by reducing the amount of time spent on foraging and thus reducing the chance of being caught by a predator. Torpid states last longer in the summer for megabats than in the winter.

During hibernation, bats enter a torpid state and decrease their body temperature for 99.6% of their hibernation period; even during periods of arousal, when they return their body temperature to normal, they sometimes enter a shallow torpid state, known as "heterothermic arousal". Some bats become dormant during higher temperatures to keep cool in the summer months.

Heterothermic bats during long migrations may fly at night and go into a torpid state roosting in the daytime. Unlike migratory birds, which fly during the day and feed during the night, nocturnal bats have a conflict between travelling and eating. The energy saved reduces their need to feed, and also decreases the duration of migration, which may prevent them from spending too much time in unfamiliar places, and decrease predation. In some species, pregnant individuals may not use torpor.

Size

It is also arguably the smallest extant species of mammal, next to the Etruscan shrew. Larger bats tend to use lower frequencies and smaller bats higher for echolocation; high-frequency echolocation is better at detecting smaller prey. Small prey may be absent in the diets of large bats as they are unable to detect them. The adaptations of a particular bat species can directly influence what kinds of prey are available to it.

Ecology

Flight has enabled bats to become one of the most widely distributed groups of mammals. Apart from the Arctic, the Antarctic and a few isolated oceanic islands, bats exist in almost every habitat on Earth. Tropical areas tend to have more species than temperate ones. Different species select different habitats during different seasons, ranging from seasides to mountains and deserts, but they require suitable roosts. Bat roosts can be found in hollows, crevices, foliage, and even human-made structures, and include "tents" the bats construct with leaves. Megabats generally roost in trees. Most microbats are nocturnal and megabats are typically diurnal or crepuscular. Microbats are known to exhibit diurnal behaviour in temperate regions during summer when there is insufficient night time to forage, and in areas where there are few avian predators during the day.

In temperate areas, some microbats migrate hundreds of kilometres to winter hibernation dens; others pass into torpor in cold weather, rousing and feeding when warm weather allows insects to be active. Others retreat to caves for winter and hibernate for as much as six months. Microbats rarely fly in rain; it interferes with their echolocation, and they are unable to hunt.

Food and feeding

Different bat species have different diets, including insects, nectar, pollen, fruit and even vertebrates. Megabats are mostly fruit, nectar and pollen eaters. Due to their small size, high-metabolism and rapid burning of energy through flight, bats must consume large amounts of food for their size. Insectivorous bats may eat over 120 percent of their body weight, while frugivorous bats may eat over twice their weight. Bats use a variety of hunting strategies. Bats get most of their water from the food they eat; many species also drink from water sources like lakes and streams, flying over the surface and dipping their tongues into the water.

The Chiroptera as a whole are in the process of losing the ability to synthesise vitamin C. In a test of 34 bat species from six major families, including major insect- and fruit-eating bat families, all were found to have lost the ability to synthesise it, and this loss may derive from a common bat ancestor, as a single mutation. At least two species of bat, the frugivorous bat (Rousettus leschenaultii) and the insectivorous bat (Hipposideros armiger), have retained their ability to produce vitamin C.

Insects

Most microbats, especially in temperate areas, prey on insects. The diet of an insectivorous bat may span many species, including flies, mosquitos, beetles, moths, grasshoppers, crickets, termites, bees, wasps, mayflies and caddisflies. Large numbers of Mexican free-tailed bats (Tadarida brasiliensis) fly hundreds of metres above the ground in central Texas to feed on migrating moths. Species that hunt insects in flight, like the little brown bat (Myotis lucifugus), may catch an insect in mid-air with the mouth, and eat it in the air or use their tail membranes or wings to scoop up the insect and carry it to the mouth. The bat may also take the insect back to its roost and eat it there. Slower moving bat species, such as the brown long-eared bat (Plecotus auritus) and many horseshoe bat species, may take or glean insects from vegetation or hunt them from perches. Insectivorous bats living at high latitudes have to consume prey with higher energetic value than tropical bats.

Fruit and nectar

Fruit eating, or frugivory, is found in both major suborders. Bats prefer ripe fruit, pulling it off the trees with their teeth. They fly back to their roosts to eat the fruit, sucking out the juice and spitting the seeds and pulp out onto the ground. This helps disperse the seeds of these fruit trees, which may take root and grow where the bats have left them, and many species of plants depend on bats for seed dispersal.

Nectar-eating bats have acquired specialised adaptations. These bats possess long muzzles and long, extensible tongues covered in fine bristles that aid them in feeding on particular flowers and plants. The tube-lipped nectar bat (Anoura fistulata) has the longest tongue of any mammal relative to its body size. This is beneficial to them in terms of pollination and feeding. Their long, narrow tongues can reach deep into the long cup shape of some flowers. When the tongue retracts, it coils up inside the rib cage. Because of these features, nectar-feeding bats cannot easily turn to other food sources in times of scarcity, making them more prone to extinction than other types of bat. Nectar feeding also aids a variety of plants, since these bats serve as pollinators, as pollen gets attached to their fur while they are feeding. Around 500 species of flowering plant rely on bat pollination and thus tend to open their flowers at night. Many rainforest plants depend on bat pollination.

Vertebrates

Some bats prey on other vertebrates, such as fish, frogs, lizards, birds and mammals. The fringe-lipped bat (Trachops cirrhosus,) for example, is skilled at catching frogs. These bats locate large groups of frogs by tracking their mating calls, then plucking them from the surface of the water with their sharp canine teeth. The greater noctule bat can catch birds in flight. Some species, like the greater bulldog bat (Noctilio leporinus) hunt fish. They use echolocation to detect small ripples on the water's surface, swoop down and use specially enlarged claws on their hind feet to grab the fish, then take their prey to a feeding roost and consume it. At least two species of bat are known to feed on other bats: the spectral bat (Vampyrum spectrum), and the ghost bat (Macroderma gigas).

Blood

A few species, specifically the common, white-winged, and hairy-legged vampire bats, feed only on animal blood (hematophagy). The common vampire bat typically feeds on large mammals such as cattle; the hairy-legged and white-winged vampires feed on birds. Vampire bats target sleeping prey and can detect deep breathing. Heat sensors in the nose help them to detect blood vessels near the surface of the skin. They pierce the animal's skin with their teeth, biting away a small flap, and lap up the blood with their tongues, which have lateral grooves adapted to this purpose. The blood is kept from clotting by an anticoagulant in the saliva.

Predators, parasites, and diseases

Bats are subject to predation from birds of prey, such as owls, hawks, and falcons, and at roosts from terrestrial predators able to climb, such as cats. Low-flying bats are vulnerable to crocodiles. Twenty species of tropical New World snakes are known to capture bats, often waiting at the entrances of refuges, such as caves, for bats to fly past. J. Rydell and J. R. Speakman argue that bats evolved nocturnality during the early and middle Eocene period to avoid predators. The evidence is thought by some zoologists to be equivocal so far.

As most mammals, bats are hosts to a number of internal and external parasites. Among ectoparasites, bats carry fleas and mites, as well as specific parasites such as bat bugs and bat flies (Nycteribiidae and Streblidae). Bats are among the few non-aquatic mammalian orders that do not host lice, possibly due to competition from more specialised parasites that occupy the same niche.

White nose syndrome is a condition associated with the deaths of millions of bats in the Eastern United States and Canada. The disease is named after a white fungus, Pseudogymnoascus destructans, found growing on the muzzles, ears, and wings of affected bats. The fungus is mostly spread from bat to bat, and causes the disease. The fungus was first discovered in central New York State in 2006 and spread quickly to the entire Eastern US north of Florida; mortality rates of 90–100% have been observed in most affected caves. New England and the mid-Atlantic states have, since 2006, witnessed entire species completely extirpated and others with numbers that have gone from the hundreds of thousands, even millions, to a few hundred or less. Nova Scotia, Quebec, Ontario, and New Brunswick have witnessed identical die offs, with the Canadian government making preparations to protect all remaining bat populations in its territory. Scientific evidence suggests that longer winters where the fungus has a longer period to infect bats result in greater mortality. In 2014, the infection crossed the Mississippi River, and in 2017, it was found on bats in Texas.

Bats are natural reservoirs for a large number of zoonotic pathogens, including rabies, endemic in many bat populations, histoplasmosis both directly and in guano, Nipah and Hendra viruses, and possibly the ebola virus, whose natural reservoir is yet unknown. Their high mobility, broad distribution, long life spans, substantial sympatry (range overlap) of species, and social behaviour make bats favourable hosts and vectors of disease. Reviews have found different answers as to whether bats have more zoonotic viruses than other mammal groups. One 2015 review found that bats, rodents, and primates all harbored significantly more zoonotic viruses (which can be transmitted to humans) than other mammal groups, though the differences among the aforementioned three groups were not significant (bats have no more zoonotic viruses than rodents and primates). Another 2020 review of mammals and birds found that the identify of the taxonomic groups did not have any impact on the probability of harboring zoonotic viruses. Instead, more diverse groups had greater viral diversity.

They seem to be highly resistant to many of the pathogens they carry, suggesting a degree of adaptation to their immune systems. Their interactions with livestock and pets, including predation by vampire bats, accidental encounters, and the scavenging of bat carcasses, compound the risk of zoonotic transmission. Bats are implicated in the emergence of severe acute respiratory syndrome (SARS) in China, since they serve as natural hosts for coronaviruses, several from a single cave in Yunnan, one of which developed into the SARS virus. However, they neither cause nor spread COVID-19.

Behaviour and life history

Social structure

Some bats lead solitary lives, while others live in colonies of more than a million. Living in large colonies lessens the risk to an individual of predation. Temperate bat species may swarm at hibernation sites as autumn approaches. This may serve to introduce young to hibernation sites, signal reproduction in adults and allow adults to breed with those from other groups.

Several species have a fission-fusion social structure, where large numbers of bats congregate in one roosting area, along with breaking up and mixing of subgroups. Within these societies, bats are able to maintain long-term relationships. Some of these relationships consist of matrilineally related females and their dependent offspring. Food sharing and mutual grooming may occur in certain species, such as the common vampire bat (Desmodus rotundus), and these strengthen social bonds.

Communication

Bats are among the most vocal of mammals and produce calls to attract mates, find roost partners and defend resources. These calls are typically low-frequency and can travel long distances. Mexican free-tailed bats are one of the few species to "sing" like birds. Males sing to attract females. Songs have three phrases: chirps, trills and buzzes, the former having "A" and "B" syllables. Bat songs are highly stereotypical but with variation in syllable number, phrase order, and phrase repetitions between individuals. Among greater spear-nosed bats (Phyllostomus hastatus), females produce loud, broadband calls among their roost mates to form group cohesion. Calls differ between roosting groups and may arise from vocal learning.

In a study on captive Egyptian fruit bats, 70% of the directed calls could be identified by the researchers as to which individual bat made it, and 60% could be categorised into four contexts: squabbling over food, jostling over position in their sleeping cluster, protesting over mating attempts and arguing when perched in close proximity to each other. The animals made slightly different sounds when communicating with different individual bats, especially those of the opposite sex. In the highly sexually dimorphic hammer-headed bat (Hypsignathus monstrosus), males produce deep, resonating, monotonous calls to attract females. Bats in flight make vocal signals for traffic control. Greater bulldog bats honk when on a collision course with each other.

Bats also communicate by other means. Male little yellow-shouldered bats (Sturnira lilium) have shoulder glands that produce a spicy odour during the breeding season. Like many other species, they have hair specialised for retaining and dispersing secretions. Such hair forms a conspicuous collar around the necks of the some Old World megabat males. Male greater sac-winged bats (Saccopteryx bilineata) have sacs in their wings in which they mix body secretions like saliva and urine to create a perfume that they sprinkle on roost sites, a behaviour known as "salting". Salting may be accompanied by singing.

Reproduction and lifecycle

Most bat species are polygynous, where males mate with multiple females. Male pipistrelle, noctule and vampire bats may claim and defend resources that attract females, such as roost sites, and mate with those females. Males unable to claim a site are forced to live on the periphery where they have less reproductive success. Promiscuity, where both sexes mate with multiple partners, exists in species like the Mexican free-tailed bat and the little brown bat. There appears to be bias towards certain males among females in these bats. In a few species, such as the yellow-winged bat and spectral bat, adult males and females form monogamous pairs. Lek mating, where males aggregate and compete for female choice through display, is rare in bats but occurs in the hammerheaded bat.

For temperate living bats, mating takes place in late summer and early autumn. Tropical bats may mate during the dry season. After copulation, the male may leave behind a mating plug to block the sperm of other males and thus ensure his paternity. In hibernating species, males are known to mate with females in torpor. Female bats use a variety of strategies to control the timing of pregnancy and the birth of young, to make delivery coincide with maximum food ability and other ecological factors. Females of some species have delayed fertilisation, in which sperm is stored in the reproductive tract for several months after mating. Mating occurs in late summer to early autumn but fertilisation does not occur until the following late winter to early spring. Other species exhibit delayed implantation, in which the egg is fertilised after mating, but remains free in the reproductive tract until external conditions become favourable for giving birth and caring for the offspring. In another strategy, fertilisation and implantation both occur, but development of the foetus is delayed until good conditions prevail. During the delayed development the mother keeps the fertilised egg alive with nutrients. This process can go on for a long period, because of the advanced gas exchange system.

For temperate living bats, births typically take place in May or June in the northern hemisphere; births in the southern hemisphere occur in November and December. Tropical species give birth at the beginning of the rainy season. In most bat species, females carry and give birth to a single pup per litter. At birth, a bat pup can be up to 40 percent of the mother's weight, and the pelvic girdle of the female can expand during birth as the two-halves are connected by a flexible ligament. Females typically give birth in a head-up or horizontal position, using gravity to make birthing easier. The young emerges rear-first, possibly to prevent the wings from getting tangled, and the female cradles it in her wing and tail membranes. In many species, females give birth and raise their young in maternity colonies and may assist each other in birthing.

Most of the care for a young bat comes from the mother. In monogamous species, the father plays a role. Allo-suckling, where a female suckles another mother's young, occurs in several species. This may serve to increase colony size in species where females return to their natal colony to breed. A young bat's ability to fly coincides with the development of an adult body and forelimb length. For the little brown bat, this occurs about eighteen days after birth. Weaning of young for most species takes place in under eighty days. The common vampire bat nurses its offspring beyond that and young vampire bats achieve independence later in life than other species. This is probably due to the species' blood-based diet, which is difficult to obtain on a nightly basis.

Life expectancy

The maximum lifespan of bats is three-and-a-half times longer than other mammals of similar size. Six species have been recorded to live over thirty years in the wild: the brown long-eared bat (Plecotus auritus), the little brown bat (Myotis lucifugus), the Siberian bat (Myotis sibiricus), the lesser mouse-eared bat (Myotis blythii) the greater horseshoe bat (Rhinolophus ferrumequinum), and the Indian flying fox (Pteropus giganteus). One hypothesis consistent with the rate-of-living theory links this to the fact that they slow down their metabolic rate while hibernating; bats that hibernate, on average, have a longer lifespan than bats that do not.

Another hypothesis is that flying has reduced their mortality rate, which would also be true for birds and gliding mammals. Bat species that give birth to multiple pups generally have a shorter lifespan than species that give birth to only a single pup. Cave-roosting species may have a longer lifespan than non-roosting species because of the decreased predation in caves. A male Siberian bat was recaptured in the wild after 41 years, making it the oldest known bat.

Interactions with humans

Conservation

Groups such as the Bat Conservation International aim to increase awareness of bats' ecological roles and the environmental threats they face. In the United Kingdom, all bats are protected under the Wildlife and Countryside Acts, and disturbing a bat or its roost can be punished with a heavy fine.
In Sarawak, Malaysia, "all bats" are protected under the Wildlife Protection Ordinance 1998, but species such as the hairless bat (Cheiromeles torquatus) are still eaten by the local communities. Humans have caused the extinction of several species of bat in modern history, the most recent being the Christmas Island pipistrelle (Pipistrellus murrayi), which was declared extinct in 2009.

Many people put up bat houses to attract bats. The 1991 University of Florida bat house is the largest occupied artificial roost in the world, with around 400,000 residents. In Britain, thickwalled and partly underground World War II pillboxes have been converted to make roosts for bats, and purpose-built bat houses are occasionally built to mitigate damage to habitat from road or other developments. Cave gates are sometimes installed to limit human entry into caves with sensitive or endangered bat species. The gates are designed not to limit the airflow, and thus to maintain the cave's micro-ecosystem. Of the 47 species of bats found in the United States, 35 are known to use human structures, including buildings and bridges. Fourteen species use bat houses.

Bats are eaten in countries across Africa, Asia and the Pacific Rim. In some cases, such as in Guam, flying foxes have become endangered through being hunted for food. There is evidence that wind turbines create sufficient barotrauma (pressure damage) to kill bats. Bats have typical mammalian lungs, which are thought to be more sensitive to sudden air pressure changes than the lungs of birds, making them more liable to fatal rupture. Bats may be attracted to turbines, perhaps seeking roosts, increasing the death rate. Acoustic deterrents may help to reduce bat mortality at wind farms.

Cultural significance

Since bats are mammals, yet can fly, they are considered to be liminal beings in various traditions. In many cultures, including in Europe, bats are associated with darkness, death, witchcraft, and malevolence. Among Native Americans such as the Creek, Cherokee and Apache, the bat is identified as a trickster. In Tanzania, a winged batlike creature known as Popobawa is believed to be a shapeshifting evil spirit that assaults and sodomises its victims. In Aztec mythology, bats symbolised the land of the dead, destruction, and decay. An East Nigerian tale tells that the bat developed its nocturnal habits after causing the death of his partner, the bush-rat, and now hides by day to avoid arrest.

More positive depictions of bats exist in some cultures. In China, bats have been associated with happiness, joy and good fortune. Five bats are used to symbolise the "Five Blessings": longevity, wealth, health, love of virtue and peaceful death. The bat is sacred in Tonga and is often considered the physical manifestation of a separable soul. In the Zapotec civilisation of Mesoamerica, the bat god presided over corn and fertility.

The Weird Sisters in Shakespeare's Macbeth used the fur of a bat in their brew. In Western culture, the bat is often a symbol of the night and its foreboding nature. The bat is a primary animal associated with fictional characters of the night, both villainous vampires, such as Count Dracula and before him Varney the Vampire, and heroes, such as the DC Comics character Batman. Kenneth Oppel's Silverwing novels narrate the adventures of a young bat, based on the silver-haired bat of North America.

The bat is sometimes used as a heraldic symbol in Spain and France, appearing in the coats of arms of the towns of Valencia, Palma de Mallorca, Fraga, Albacete, and Montchauvet. Three US states have an official state bat. Texas and Oklahoma are represented by the Mexican free-tailed bat, while Virginia is represented by the Virginia big-eared bat (Corynorhinus townsendii virginianus).

Economics

Insectivorous bats in particular are especially helpful to farmers, as they control populations of agricultural pests and reduce the need to use pesticides. It has been estimated that bats save the agricultural industry of the United States anywhere from $3.7billion to $53billion per year in pesticides and damage to crops. This also prevents the overuse of pesticides, which can pollute the surrounding environment, and may lead to resistance in future generations of insects.

Bat dung, a type of guano, is rich in nitrates and is mined from caves for use as fertiliser. During the US Civil War, saltpetre was collected from caves to make gunpowder.  At the time, it was believed that the nitrate all came from the bat guano, but it is now known that most of it is produced by nitrifying bacteria.

The Congress Avenue Bridge in Austin, Texas, is the summer home to North America's largest urban bat colony, an estimated 1,500,000 Mexican free-tailed bats. About 100,000 tourists a year visit the bridge at twilight to watch the bats leave the roost.

See also 
 Bat detector

Explanatory notes

References

Sources

External links 

  of UK Bat Conservation Trust
 Tree of Life
 Microbat Vision 
 Analyses of several kinds of bat echolocation

 
Animal flight
Animals that use echolocation
Articles containing video clips
Cave mammals
Extant Ypresian first appearances
Nocturnal animals
Taxa named by Johann Friedrich Blumenbach